The following is a list of weather events that occurred (and are occurring) on Earth in the year 2023. The year began with a La Niña. The most common weather events to have a significant impact are blizzards, cold waves, droughts, heat waves, wildfires, floods, tornadoes, and tropical cyclones.

Deadliest events

Types 

The following listed different types of special weather conditions worldwide.

Cold snaps and winter storms 

In January, a cold snap in Afghanistan killed at least 166 people and more than 80,000 livestock. Two days later, snow fell in Algeria for the first time in ten years.

Heat waves and droughts

Tornadoes

Tropical and subtropical cyclones 

The first named tropical cyclone of the year was Cyclone Hale, which caused minimal damage and one death in New Zealand as an extratropical cyclone. Later in January, Cyclone Cheneso killed at least 33 people in Madagascar and left 20 missing. In addition, it damaged over 13,000 houses and 18 medical centers.

Extratropical cyclones and European windstorms 

Cyclone Helios which formed in early February brought recorded rain and humidity to Malta from 80 years. Luqa recorded rain with a total of 140.4 millimeters. meteo.it defined it as a Mediterranean tropical-like cyclone as it dissipated on February 11.

Wildfires

Timeline 
This is a timeline of weather events during 2023.

January 

November 2022–January 2023 – The rainy season in Malawi resulted in 42 fatalities from various severe weather incidents.
December 26–January 25 — 2022–2023 California floods: A series of atmospheric rivers impacts California, killing 22 people and causing at least 200,000 power outages in the state.
December 18, 2022–February 5, 2023 — A shear line system caused flooding and landslides across the Philippines, killing 97 people with 25 more missing.
January 4 — Heavy rains caused a house to collapse in Matala, Angola, with two people being killed.
January 4–5 — Flooding and landslides in Buvaku, Democratic Republic of the Congo kills five people.
January 6–8 — Flooding and landslides in Indonesia kills five people.
January 10 — Flooding and landslides in Minas Gerais, Brazil kill six people.
January 10–17 — A cold snap in Afghanistan kills at least 166 people and more than 80,000 livestock.
January 12 — An early season tornado outbreak causes at least nine deaths in the Southern United States and several tornado emergencies.
January 12 — A lightning strike in HaOgen, Israel kills a person walking their dog.
January 13–16 — Heavy rains in Tijuana, Mexico cause extreme flooding and a mudslide which killed two people.
January 14 — A flash flood in Medellín, Colombia killed two people and injured 25 others.
January 15 — Fatehpur, Rajasthan records a temperature of -4.7 Celsius (23.4 Fahrenheit) from a cold wave.
January 16 – Two EF1 tornadoes touch down in Iowa, the first tornadoes in the state in January since 1967.
January 16 — A landslide in Locroja District, Peru kills three people and leaves three others injured.
January 17 — An avalanche strikes Nyingchi, Tibet, killing 28.
January 18–19 — Flooding and landslides in Brazil kill 3 and leave 2 missing.
January 20 — Cyclone Cheneso leaves 33 dead and 20 missing in Madagascar.
January 27–February 6 — Heavy amounts of rain struck Auckland and the upper North Island in New Zealand causing massive flooding resulting in 4 deaths  and 3 injuries 

January 31–February 2 — An ice storm kills 10 people and causes 500,000 power outages across the Southern United States.

February 

February 1 –  of snow falls in New York City, becoming the latest date for first measurable snow there.
February 2 – Avalanche has buried a tourist near Mały Kościelec in Tatra Mountains, Poland. After a few days the men died. 
February 3–4 – A cold wave briefly hit New England and Canada.
February 5–7 –  In the Mariano Nicolás Valcárcel District, 15 died from landslides that occurred after heavy rains.
February 11–February 15 – Cyclone Gabrielle struck New Zealand particularly in the Gisborne and Hawkes Bay areas leaving 11 people dead while +3 are currently missing. Making it the most destructive cyclone in New Zealand since 1988.
February 16 – Record warm temperatures occur in the Eastern United States. Islip, New York, Bridgeport, Connecticut, Bedford, Massachusetts and Newport, Rhode Island all set record highs for the month of February. The record in Newport was broken by 6°F (4°C).
February 18–21 – Floods and mudslides kill at least 64 people across the state of São Paulo in Brazil.
February 22–March 13 – Cyclone Freddy makes landfall in Madagascar and Mozambique, killing at least 238 people and damaging thousands of homes.
February 21–28 – A major storm complex caused almost a million power outages throughout the United States, with Michigan being the most affected, with an ice storm that left at least one dead in Michigan when a power line fell on a volunteer firefighter.

March

March 1–3 – A storm complex containing both severe thunderstorms and heavy snowfall killed at least 13 people across the United States, including five in Kentucky, three in Alabama, two in Tennessee, one in Arkansas, and one in Mississippi.
March 6 – A landslide in Natuna Regency, Indonesia kills at least 50 people and four others remain missing.
March 7–Present – At least six people were killed by Cyclone Yaku in Peru and Ecuador.
March 9–10 – Two people were killed and 9,400 were under evacuation orders as an atmospheric river brought heavy rains and flooding to parts of California.
March 15 – 16 deaths were reported as massive flash floods struck the Turkish provinces of Adiyaman and Sanliurfa, turning streets into rivers. These areas had been particularly hit hard by the past earthquakes.

Space weather 

January 9 — An X1.9-class solar flare causes a widespread radio blackout across South and Central America. The sunspot that caused the solar flare also caused an X1.2-class solar flare on January 5.

Events in meteorology

January 9 — Perseverance provides the first ever detailed weather report on Mars.

See also 

 Weather of 2022

Notes

References 

2023 meteorology
2023